Lanaé (aka Lanae' Hale) (born September 15, 1983) is an American singer and songwriter from Florida. Her music is sometimes described as "deep pop", which is radio pop music mixed with deeper thoughtful lyrics. She has released three works: an EP, Lanae' Hale EP, in 2007, a full-length release, Back & Forth, in 2009 and an EP, Lanaé, in 2017.

Biography 
Hale grew up in Titusville, Florida for most her life. Hale writes music based around her struggle with depression, and the freedom she feels from God that helped set her free.

In 2007 Centricity Music signed Hale to a record deal and released her first EP Lanae' Hale EP. iTunes chose Hale's single from the EP, "Spring Again", as the Discovery Download in January 2008 resulting in over 100,000 downloads. In February 2009 the title track off of the title track her first feature full-length album, Back & Forth was featured on the MTV show, The Hills. In 2017, after a long hiatus, she released a new self-titled EP, Lanaé.

Discography
 Lanae' Hale EP (2007)
 Back & Forth" (2009)
 Lanaé (2017)

References

External links
 

American women singer-songwriters
Living people
1986 births
American performers of Christian music
Centricity Music artists
21st-century American women singers
21st-century American singers